Agafia Karpovna Lykova (born 17 April 1944) is a Russian Old Believer, part of the Lykov family, who has lived alone in the taiga for most of her life. As of 2016, she resides in the Western Sayan mountains, in the Republic of Khakassia. Lykova became a national phenomenon in the early 1980s when Vasily Peskov published articles about her family and their extreme isolation from the rest of society. Lykova is the sole surviving member of the family and has been mostly self-sufficient since 1988, when her father died.

Early life 
Lykova was born in a hollowed out pine washtub in 1944 to Karp Osipovich Lykov and Akulina Lykova. She was their fourth child, and the second to be born in the Taiga.

For the first 35 years of her life, Lykova did not have contact with anyone outside of her immediate family. Information about the outside world came from her father's stories and the family's Russian Orthodox Bible.

In the summer of 1978, a group of four geologists discovered the family by chance, while circling the area in a helicopter. The scientists reported that Lykova spoke a language "distorted by a lifetime of isolation" that sounded akin to a "slow, blurred cooing". This unusual speech led to the misconception that Lykova was mentally disabled. Later, after observing her skill in hunting, cooking, sewing, reading and construction, this original misconception was revised. Peskov's book reports that Lykova's vocabulary expanded as she made further contact with the larger world, and he reports many of her uses of "unexpected" words in conversation.

Isolation 

In 70 years, Lykova has ventured out of the family settlement six times. The first time was in the 1980s, shortly after Vasily Peskov's articles about the family's isolation turned them into a national phenomenon. The Soviet government paid for her to tour the Soviet Union for a month, during which time she saw airplanes, horses, cars and money for the first time. Since then, she has left only to seek medical treatment, visit distant relatives and to meet other Old Believers.

Lykova prefers her life in the taiga to life in the larger towns or cities. She claims that the air and water outside of the taiga makes her sick. She also said that she finds the busy roads frightening. In 2011 Agafia formally re-joined the Belokrinitskaya branch of the Old Believers during a visit by Metropolitan Korniliy (Titov) coinciding with her 69th birthday. In 2014, she wrote a letter that was published online, requesting anyone to come to her home to be her helper as her "strength is going". She claimed in that letter to have "a lump on [her] right breast", a possible sign that she has developed cancer.

In January 2016, it was reported that Lykova was airlifted to a hospital due to leg pain. Agafia was treated at a hospital in Tashtagol, and planned to return to the wilderness once emergency services were able to airlift her home. According to The Siberian Times, she did and as of mid-2019 she was still living there. In 2021 it was reported that the oligarch Oleg Deripaska had paid for the construction of a new cabin in the wilderness for her to live in due to the deterioration of her previous dwelling.

Relationships 

During her talks with Peskov, Lykova told him she was married to someone during one of her trips outside of the taiga. No further information was offered.

For 18 years, Lykova had a neighbour, Yerofei Sedov (one of the geologists who visited the area). Sedov told Vice journalists that he came to the Taiga to help Lykova. Due to his old age and disability, however, he heavily relied on Lykova for food and firewood throughout his stay. While the two were generally on friendly terms, there were two occasions where Lykova says that Sedov threatened her and "behaved sinfully". Sedov died on 3 May 2015, at the age of 77.

See also
 Lykov family

References 

1944 births
Living people
Russian hermits
Old Believers
People from Khakassia